Platycorynus dejeani is a species of leaf beetle. It was first described by the Italian entomologist Giuseppe Bertoloni from Inhambane, Mozambique in 1849. It occurs widely in sub-Saharan Africa.

Distribution
In East Africa, the species' range extends from Ethiopia down to the former Cape Province in South Africa. The species also occurs in Senegal, the Central African Republic and the Democratic Republic of the Congo.

Gallery

References

Eumolpinae
Beetles of Africa
Beetles described in 1849